Hliðskjálf (Old Norse for "Hlidskjalf") is the sixth album by Norwegian solo artist Burzum. This album was the second to be recorded by Varg Vikernes while he was imprisoned for murder and arson and also Burzum's second ambient album. Dauði Baldrs and Hliðskjálf were created with synthesized instruments as he was not allowed any other instruments while being imprisoned. For this album Vikernes was allowed to have the keyboard and recording device for only one week. The first pressing of its vinyl format release was pressed on a shiny burnished color reminiscent of gold.

Track listing

Credits
Varg Vikernes – synthesizers, audio engineering, songwriting
Pytten – mastering

Artwork
Tania Stene – cover art
Stephen O'Malley – design/additional art

The additional art in the booklet is taken mainly from silent films. For example, the image for "Frijôs goldene Tränen" is taken from F.W. Murnau's Faust.

References

External links
Burzum discography
About how I recorded the Burzum albums

Burzum albums
1999 albums